Vladimir Ilyich Bychek (21 October 1952 – 13 December 2015) was a Russian professional football player and coach.

Career
Bychek began playing professional football with local side FC SKA-Khabarovsk in 1973. He played a total of 14 seasons for the club in the Soviet First League and Soviet Second League, making 479 appearances for the club (the second most in all-time). In 1980, Bychek was part of the SKA squad that achieved a best-ever sixth-place finish in the Soviet First League (the squad was rewarded with a tour of Mozambique).

In 1976, Bychek was named to the list of the best 22 players in the Soviet First and Second Leagues. As a result, he was able to join Soviet Top League club PFC CSKA Moscow where he made 22 appearances in the 1977 season.

After he retired from playing, Bychek became a football coach. He led his former club, SKA from 1988 to 1994, even playing 15 Soviet First League matches during the 1993 season as the club struggled to pay its players.

Personal
Bychek died at the age of 63.

References

External links
Profile at Footballfacts.ru

1952 births
2015 deaths
Soviet footballers
FC SKA-Khabarovsk players
PFC CSKA Moscow players
Soviet football managers
Russian football managers
Association football defenders
FC SKA-Khabarovsk managers